Peter M. Sullivan is a Democratic former member of the New Hampshire House of Representatives and a former member of the Board of Aldermen in the city of Manchester, New Hampshire. He served as a New Hampshire state representative from Hillsborough County, from 2001 until 2006, during which he served on the House Committees on Criminal Justice and Public Safety and State-Federal Relations and Veterans Affairs. From 2008 to 2010, Sullivan served as a member of the Manchester Board of Aldermen from the city's downtown Ward 3. He served in the New Hampshire House again from 2012 through 2014.

Early life and career
Born in Virginia, Sullivan is a graduate of the University of New Orleans and the University of Arkansas School of Law. He served for ten years as a member of the United States Army Reserve and the Army National Guard, including five years of service as a commissioned officer. He has been married to his wife Katya since 1995.

Sullivan won a seat on Manchester's Board of Aldermen on November 6, 2007. He defeated incumbent Pat Long, a fellow Democrat, in the non-partisan municipal election. He was the only candidate to defeat a sitting member of the Board in 2007.

In February, 2012, Sullivan returned to the New Hampshire House following his election in a special election. He was re-elected in the November 2012 general election.

External links
Official website of the New Hampshire House of Representatives
 
Peter Sullivan for Alderman campaign blog

1967 births
Living people
Democratic Party members of the New Hampshire House of Representatives
Politicians from Manchester, New Hampshire
People from Virginia
United States Army officers
University of Arkansas School of Law alumni
University of New Orleans alumni